Broadsheet is the largest of newspaper formats and is characterized by long vertical pages.

Broadsheet may also refer to:
Broadsheet, an art journal published by the Contemporary Art Society in Adelaide, later Contemporary Art Centre of South Australia
Broadsheet ballad, a single sheet of inexpensive paper printed on one side with a ballad
Broadsheet (magazine), former New Zealand feminist magazine
Broadsheet (TV programme), former Irish television current affairs programme
Broadside (printing), a printing format on a large sheet of paper printed on one side only, largely of historical importance for publishing ephemera
Broadsheet (website), an Australian online city guide covering food and drink, fashion and shopping, art and design, and entertainment